Miranda is one of the 14 municipalities (municipios) that makes up the Venezuelan state of Carabobo and, according to the 2011 census by the National Institute of Statistics of Venezuela, the municipality has a population of 29,092.   The town of Miranda is the shire town of the Miranda Municipality.

Name
The municipality is one of several in Venezuela named Miranda Municipality for independence hero Francisco de Miranda.

Demographics
The Miranda Municipality, according to a 2007 population estimate by the National Institute of Statistics of Venezuela, has a population of 27,609 (up from 23,869 in 2000). This amounts to 1.2% of the state's population.

Government
The mayor of the Miranda Municipality is Eduardo A. Sequera.  He replaced Fernando Jimenez shortly after the last municipal elections.  The municipality is divided into one parish (Miranda).

References

External links
miranda-carabobo.gob.ve 

Municipalities of Carabobo